European Cycling Championships may refer to:

European Road Championships, European Championships of road cycling 
UEC European Track Championships, European Championships of track cycling